KGPAA Paku Alam IX (7 May 1938 – 21 November 2015) was the ruler of Pakualaman, in central Java, Indonesia.  His court name before he became Paku Alam IX was Bendara Raden Mas Ambarkusumo.  He succeeded as Paku Alam upon the death of the last ruler, his father Paku Alam VIII, on 11 September 1998, and was formally installed as Kanjeng Gusti Pangeran Adipati Arya Paku Alam IX on 26 May 1999.

Like his predecessor, he was also the vice-governor of the Yogyakarta Special Region, serving under Sultan Hamengkubuwana X.

Paku Alam IX resided in Paku Alaman palace in Yogyakarta. He died on 21 November 2015 after being admitted to a hospital five days earlier.

He is buried in the family cemetery in Girigondo in the nearby Kulon Progo district.

On January 7, 2016, his eldest son Kanjeng Gusti Pangeran Haryo (KGPH) Suryodilogo succeeded him as Paku Alam X.

References

Princes of Pakualaman
2015 deaths
1938 births
People from Yogyakarta
Indonesian royalty